Owen Marshall, Counselor at Law is an American legal drama, jointly created by David Victor and former law professor Jerry McNeely, that starred Arthur Hill. The series was broadcast on ABC from 1971 to 1974; Victor and McNeely produced it under the "Groverton Productions" banner through Universal Television, then an MCA company. A two-hour pilot movie, titled "A Pattern of Morality," had aired as a 1971 ABC Movie of the Week entry prior to the beginning of the series run.

Synopsis
Hill starred as Owen Marshall, a former prosecutor turned compassionate defense attorney, who defended various clients in Santa Barbara, California, with the help of his young assistants. During the series run, several actors appeared as Marshall's assistants, including Reni Santoni, David Soul, and Lee Majors.

Owen Marshall, Counselor at Law had two crossovers with Marcus Welby, M.D., another series in whose creation and production David Victor was directly involved. In the first, "Men Who Care," Welby (Robert Young) persuades Marshall to defend a man who is accused of killing his daughter's boyfriend, the daughter being one of Welby's patients. In the second, "I've Promised You a Father," Marshall defends Welby's colleague Dr. Steven Kiley (James Brolin) in a paternity suit filed by a young nurse, who claims that Kiley is the father of her child.

Cast

Arthur Hill as Owen Marshall
David Soul as Ted Warrick
Reni Santoni as Danny Paterno
Lee Majors as Jess Brandon
Joan Darling as Frieda Krause
Christine Matchett as Melissa Marshall

Guest stars
The series marked one of director Steven Spielberg's earliest television directing stints and boasted many well-known guest stars, including:

Christine Belford
Pat Boone
Rory Calhoun
John David Carson
John Davidson
Gloria DeHaven
John Denver
Patty Duke
Richard Eastham
Farrah Fawcett
Paul Fix
Arthur Franz
Sharon Gless
Louis Gossett Jr.
Mark Hamill
Pat Harrington Jr.
Darby Hinton
Sam Jaffe
Russell Johnson
Kathleen Lloyd
Donald Mantooth
Randolph Mantooth
Scott Marlowe
Tim Matheson
Darren McGavin
Donna Mills
Vic Morrow
Ricky Nelson
Gerald S. O'Loughlin
Michael Parks
Dennis Patrick
Larry Pennell
Edward Platt
Michael Rupert
Dick Sargent
Tom Selleck
William Shatner
Martin Sheen
O. J. Simpson
Richard X. Slattery
Susan Strasberg
Joan Tompkins (thricely)
John Travolta
Lindsay Wagner
Jane Wyman
Dana Wynter

Episodes

References

External links

 
 

1971 American television series debuts
1974 American television series endings
ABC Movie of the Week
American Broadcasting Company original programming
1970s American drama television series
1970s American legal television series
English-language television shows
Television series by Universal Television
Television shows set in Santa Barbara, California